Amine Attouchi (born 7 January 1992) is a Moroccan footballer who plays for Saudi Professional League side Abha as a defender.

He was called up for 2017 Africa Cup of Nations.

Honours
Wydad Casablanca
 CAF Champions League: 2017
 Botola: 2015, 2017

References

1992 births
Living people
Footballers from Casablanca
Association football defenders
2017 Africa Cup of Nations players
Moroccan footballers
Moroccan expatriate footballers
Morocco international footballers
Wydad AC players
Al Dhafra FC players
Abha Club players
Botola players
UAE Pro League players
Saudi Professional League players
Expatriate footballers in the United Arab Emirates
Moroccan expatriate sportspeople in the United Arab Emirates
Expatriate footballers in Saudi Arabia
Moroccan expatriate sportspeople in Saudi Arabia